Historic District C is a national historic district located at Boonville, Cooper County, Missouri.  It encompasses 63 contributing buildings in a predominantly residential section of Boonville.  The district includes representative examples of Greek Revival and Queen Anne style architecture.  Notable buildings include the Childers, Sr., Residence (1892-1900), Schmidt Residence (1915), Moore Residence (1880s), Holmes Property (1829-1843), Holmes Property (1829-1840), Patterson Residence (1869), Boonville Daily News Property (1910-1917), Higbee Residence (1911-1917), Knabe Rental Property (pre-1849), Catlett Property (1839), Bittner Residence (1900-1910), Putnam/Wiehe Residence (1836-1839), Cooper Residence (1860s), Travis Property (1850s-1860s), and Zoeller Property (c. 1850).

It was listed on the National Register of Historic Places in 1983.

References

Historic districts on the National Register of Historic Places in Missouri
Greek Revival architecture in Missouri
Queen Anne architecture in Missouri
National Register of Historic Places in Cooper County, Missouri
Boonville, Missouri